Charles Muzzicato (March 1, 1901 – December 1968) was an American physician and politician from New York.

Life
He was born on March 1, 1901. He attended the public schools in Manhattan and Rhodes Preparatory School. He graduated from Alfred University, and M.D. from Loyola University Chicago. Then he interned at the Metropolitan Hospital Center, and later specialised in radiology, studying at the New York Post Graduate Hospital and Columbia College of Physicians and Surgeons.

Muzzicato was a member of the New York State Senate (18th D.) in 1941 and 1942. At the New York state election, 1942, he ran on the Republican ticket for one of New York's at-large congressional seats, but was defeated by Democrat Matthew J. Merritt.

He died in December 1968; and was buried at the Ascension Cemetery in Monsey, New York.

Sources

1901 births
1968 deaths
People from Manhattan
American radiologists
Republican Party New York (state) state senators
People from Ramapo, New York
Alfred University alumni
Loyola University Chicago alumni
Columbia University Vagelos College of Physicians and Surgeons alumni
20th-century American physicians
20th-century American politicians